MHS may refer to:

Schools
Malibu High School, Malibu, California, US
Marianas High School, Saipan, CNMI, US
 Marryatville High School, Adelaide, Australia
 Marshwood High School, South Berwick, Maine, US
Massapequa High School, Massapequa, New York, US
Matthew Humberstone School, Cleethorpes, England
Mauldin High School, Mauldin, South Carolina, US
McDonald High School, McDonald, Ohio, US
McMinnville High School, McMinnville, Oregon, US
Melbourne High School, Melbourne, Australia
Moscow High School, Moscow, Idaho, US
Milpitas High School, Milpitas, California, US
Muscatine High School, Muscatine, Iowa, US
Marysville High School (disambiguation)
Milford High School (disambiguation)
Montpelier High School (disambiguation)

Other uses
Air Memphis (ICAO code: MHS), an Egyptian airline
Ingenuity (helicopter), formerly known as Mars Helicopter Scout
Master of Health Science, a graduate degree program
Meadowhall Interchange, a railway station in England, National Rail station code
Message Handling System, a past Novell email protocol 
Michigan Humane Society, in animal welfare
Microwave Humidity Sounder, satellite-borne instrument
Mietshäuser Syndikat, a federated network of collectively owned houses in Germany
Military Health System, of US DoD
Modular Handgun System
Montana Historical Society

See also
Mental health service (disambiguation)